Gunhild Dahlberg (born 6 April 1975) is a Norwegian television presenter, journalist, and author.

Tv appearances
 XLTV (1998–99)
 Go' Elg (1999–2000)
 Åpen Post (2002)
 Et Dukkehjem (2004)
 Norge Rundt (2005)
 9 av 10 Nordmenn (2006)
 Barnas Superjul (2007)
 Der Ingen Skulle Tru at Nokon Hunne Bu (2007)
 Celebert Selskap (2010)
 Koselig Med Peis (2011)
 4-Stjerners Middag (2011)
 Tørnquist Show (2012–2013)
 Sommertid (2014)
 Underholdningsåret 2014 
 Gunhild Hjelper Deg (2014)
 Fjellflørt (2015)
 Nabolaget (2015)
 Bolig Til Salgs (2016)

Bibliography
 Dahlberg, Gunhild. (2008) Norge i dag: En fullstendig subjektiv reiseskildring fra en syklende reporter på svært lavt blodsukker fra Nordkapp til Lindesnes. Kagge forlag. 
 Dahlberg, Gunhild & Espeland, Webjørn S. (2011) Sånn ca. alt om sex og kjærlighet. Aschehoug.

References

1975 births
Living people
Norwegian television presenters
Norwegian women television presenters
Norwegian journalists
Norwegian women journalists
21st-century Norwegian writers
21st-century Norwegian women writers